Correo Central is a station on Line E of the Buenos Aires Underground.  Passengers are able to transfer to the Leandro N. Alem Station on Line B.  The site is located in the barrio of San Nicolás and the station is situated underneath the Néstor Kirchner Cultural Centre. The station was opened on 3 June 2019 as part of the extension of the line from Bolívar to Retiro.

References

External links

Buenos Aires Underground stations